Goodwood may refer to:

Events 
 Goodwood Festival of Speed, a motorsport event in the United Kingdom
 Glorious Goodwood, a horseracing event in the United Kingdom
 Goodwood Revival, a historical motorsport event in the United Kingdom

Places and structures

Australia
 Goodwood, South Australia, Australia
Electoral district of Goodwood, a former electoral district in South Australia
 Goodwood, Tasmania, Australia

Canada
Goodwood, Nova Scotia
Goodwood, Ontario

New Zealand
Goodwood, New Zealand, a farming community near Palmerston

South Africa
 Goodwood, Cape Town, South Africa

United Kingdom
 Goodwood, Leicestershire, England
 Goodwood House, West Sussex, England - the estate includes:
 Goodwood plant, of Rolls-Royce Motor Cars
 Chichester/Goodwood Airport, West Sussex, England
 Goodwood Circuit, West Sussex, England
 Goodwood Racecourse, West Sussex, England
 Goodwood Cricket Club, West Sussex, England

United States
Goodwood Plantation, Tallahassee, Florida
Goodwood (Richmond, Massachusetts), a historic house

Other uses
 Operation Goodwood, a World War II British military operation during the Battle of Normandy, July 1944
 Operation Goodwood (naval), a series of Royal Naval attacks on the German battleship Tirpitz in August 1944 during World War II
 Operation Goodwood (1968−1969), actions fought between the 1st Australian Task Force and the Viet Cong and North Vietnamese Army during the Vietnam War